The 8th Annual Tony Awards, presented by the American Theatre Wing, took place at the Plaza Hotel Grand Ballroom on March 28, 1954. It was broadcast on radio by the NBC Radio Network. The Master of Ceremonies was James Sauter and the presenter was Helen Hayes. Performers were Frances Greer, Lucy Monroe, Russell Nype, Joseph Scandur, and Jean Swetland. Music was by Meyer Davis and his Orchestra.

Award winners
Source:Infoplease

Production

Performance

Craft

Multiple nominations and awards

The following productions received multiple awards.

4 wins: Ondine 
3 wins: Kismet and The Teahouse of the August Moon 
2 wins: Can-Can

References

External links
Tony Awards Official Site

Tony Awards ceremonies
1954 in theatre
1954 awards
1954 in the United States
1954 in New York City
1954 awards in the United States
March 1954 events in the United States